Terrenate (formally:  San Nicolás Terrenate) is a city, and the surrounding municipality of the same name, in the Mexican state of Tlaxcala. 
It is situated in the highest part of the state, at 2,680 metres above sea level. "Terrenate" is a  Nahuatl name meaning "land the colour of masa" (maize dough).

Location

Terrenate is in the extreme northeast of the state, adjacent to the municipalities of:

to the west, Tetla de la Solidaridad, Emiliano Zapata, and Lázaro Cárdenas
to the south, Huamantla and Xaloztoc
to the east,  Altzayanca 
to the north, Ixtacamaxtitlán in the neighbouring state of Puebla.

Economy

Chiefly agricultural: crops and livestock. Little other industry or employment opportunities. Migration levels, particularly to the United States, are high.

Climate

Towns

In 1996, what are now the municipalities of Emiliano Zapata and Lázaro Cárdenas, were split off from Terrenate when the state created 16 new municipalities.

In addition to the municipal seat, the municipality has another six towns and numerous hamlets.
 San Nicolás Terrenate
 Toluca de Guadalupe
 Nicolás Bravo
 Villareal
 El Capulín
 Guadalupe Victoria (Tepetates)
 Los Ameles del Rosario (Acolco)

Culture 

The church of San Nicolás de Tolentino in the municipal seat dates from the 17th century.

References

External links
https://web.archive.org/web/20091230221120/http://www.terrenateonline.com/

Populated places in Tlaxcala